Tera or TERA may refer to:

People
 Tera Patrick (born 1976) American pornographic actress
 Tera people, an ethnic group in Gombe State, Nigeria

Places
 Téra, Niger
 Tera, Paphos, Cyprus
 Tera, Kutch, India
 Tera Fort, a fort in Kutch, Gujarat, India

Computing
 TERA, a type of network connector
 Tera Computer Company, an American computer software and hardware manufacturer
 Sega TeraDrive
 TERA (video game), 2011

Other uses 
 tera-, a metric prefix denoting a factor of 1012
 tERA, a baseball statistic
 Tera language, a Chadic language spoken in north-Nigeria
 TERA rifle, Japanese special rifles developed for paratroopers
 Queen Tera, a fictional Egyptian queen in Bram Stoker's novel The Jewel of Seven Stars
 RS Tera, an international racing class of sailing boats
 Topfree Equal Rights Association (TERA), a women's advocacy group

See also
 Terra (disambiguation)
 Terror (disambiguation)
 Thera (disambiguation)